The Reformatory Political Federation (RPF) was a minor Protestant Christian political party in the Netherlands.

History
The RPF was founded in 1975 by three groups of orthodox Christians. The first group were members of the Protestant-Christian Anti-Revolutionary Party, secondly the National Evangelical Union, a small party which had earlier left the ARP, and several independent electoral committees. The founders opposed the formation of the Christian Democratic Appeal, because the Protestant ARP and Christian Historical Union would join the Catholic People's Party. During the period of pillarisation, the Catholics and Protestants had lived in a form of cold war.

The RPF sought to unite all other orthodox Protestant Christian parties, namely the Reformed Political League (GPV) and the Reformed Political Party (SGP).

In the subsequent 1977 elections the RPF was unable to win any seats. In 1981 it won two seats in House of Representatives (Meindert Leerling and Aad Wagenaar). In the period 1981 to 2002 it had one to three members. It also won seats in the Dutch Senate. The remained in opposition throughout its existence.

In 1985 one of its two members of parliament seceded form the party to form the Anti-Revolutionaries 1985, the party never got any seat.

In 1996 RPF party leader Leen van Dijke came under public criticism when magazine Nieuwe Revu had suggested that in an interview he had declared: "Why would stealing, for example committing social welfare fraud, be less of a sin than going against the seventh commandment? Yes, why should someone in a homosexual relationship be better than a thief?" When turmoil broke out, Van Dijke explained that he had meant to convey a universally accepted vision within Christianity that trespassing one of God's commandments makes a man guilty before God, and that all breaches herein are equal. But the general public, and especially the Dutch gay movement, criticised the statement as printed in Nieuwe Revu heavily, considering it discrimination. As such, a gay magazine (Gaykrant) reported it to the Attorney General. In 1999 the Dutch high court ruled that Van Dijke's views were not discriminatory according to Dutch law.

From 1998 the RPF and GPV began to work closely together in parliament. In 2000 the Christian Union, in which both would unite was officially founded. In 2002 it first contested in elections and won 5 seats.

Linked organisations
The Party magazine was called RPF signal and the scientific foundation Marnix van St. Aldegonde Stichting. The Evangelical Broadcasting Association had strong personal and ideological links with the RPF, but it was never officially linked to the party.

Ideology
The RPF believed that society should be based on Biblical norms and values. The political differences between the GPV and SGP, the two other orthodox Protestant parties, were marginal and based on theological differences.

The RPF was a staunch defender of the Dutch monarchy and a strong government. It opposed abortion, euthanasia and same-sex marriage. In economic and environmental issues, the RPF was in favour of strong government influence.

Internationally the party was comparable to the American Christian Right and the small Protestant parties of Scandinavia, such as the Christian Democratic Party of Norway, the Swedish and Danish Christian Democrats. The RPF never took part in a government coalition, instead it chose to voice its concerns over government policies, while acknowledging that the party itself (a testimonial party) was not big enough to force its opinion upon others.

Electorate

The RPF was supported by orthodox Reformed of many denominations, such as the Reformed Churches and the Dutch Reformed Church. But also members of newer churches such as the Evangelical Church and the Pentecostal community supported this party. The electorate was concentrated in Zeeland, the Veluwe, parts of Overijssel, forming what is known as the Dutch Bible Belt.

Party leaders 
 Meindert Leerling: 1980 - 1994
 Leen van Dijke: 1994 - 2001

Notes

References

Christian Union (Netherlands)
Confessional parties in the Netherlands
Defunct Christian political parties
Defunct political parties in the Netherlands
Political parties established in 1975
Political parties disestablished in 2001
Protestant political parties
Conservative parties in the Netherlands
1975 establishments in the Netherlands
2001 disestablishments in the Netherlands